is a Japanese field hockey player. At the 2012 Summer Olympics she competed with the Japan women's national field hockey team in the women's tournament.

References

External links
 

1986 births
Living people
Japanese female field hockey players
Asian Games medalists in field hockey
Asian Games bronze medalists for Japan
Field hockey players at the 2010 Asian Games
Field hockey players at the 2012 Summer Olympics
Field hockey players at the 2016 Summer Olympics
Medalists at the 2010 Asian Games
Olympic field hockey players of Japan
Sportspeople from Gifu Prefecture